Alfredo Angeli (7 August 1927, in Livorno – 25 November 2005, in Rome) was an Italian director and screenwriter.

Born in Livorno, Angeli entered the cinema industry in 1958, being the assistant director of Luigi Zampa in The City Stands Trial; after having collaborated with, among others, Camillo Mastrocinque and Vittorio Cottafavi, in the early 1960s he started working as a director of commercial, and between the 1960s and the 1990s he directed over 3,000 commercials. He made his feature film directorial debut in 1967, with the satirical The Strange Night, which was entered into the 17th Berlin International Film Festival. In 1981 he directed a RAI TV-series of great success, Benedetta & Company.

Filmography 
1967: The Strange Night
1976: Languid Kisses, Wet Caresses
1983: Benedetta & Company (TV)
1984: L'addio a Enrico Berlinguer (Co-director)
1997: Con rabbia e con amore
1999: Giochi pericolosi (TV)
2001: Un altro mondo è possibile

References

External links 
 

1927 births
2005 deaths
Italian film directors
20th-century Italian screenwriters
People from Livorno
Italian television directors
Italian male screenwriters
20th-century Italian male writers